Natalya Kulinich Tarassevitch  (born 19 July 1988) is a Kazakhstani volleyball player. She is a member of the Kazakhstan women's national volleyball team and played for Irtysh Kazchrome in 2011.

She was part of the Kazakhstani national team at the 2011 FIVB World Grand Prix.

Clubs 

  Irtysh Kazchrome (2011)

References

External links 

 FIVB profile
 CEV profile

1988 births
Living people
Kazakhstani women's volleyball players
Place of birth missing (living people)
People from Temirtau